APC most often refers to:
 Armoured personnel carrier, an armoured fighting vehicle

APC or Apc may also refer to:

Computing and technology
 Auto Power Control, a system of powering e.g. laser diodes
 Adaptive predictive coding, an analog-to-digital conversion system
 Advanced process control, a concept in control theory
 Alternative PHP Cache, a PHP accelerator program
 Angled physical contact, a technique used in optical fiber connections
 APC (magazine), a computer magazine in Australia
 APC III or Advanced Personal Computer, a 1983 NEC microcomputer
 APC by Schneider Electric, a manufacturer of uninterruptible power supplies, electronics peripherals and data center products; the company was formerly known as American Power Conversion Corporation or simply APC
 APC-7 connector, a coaxial connector used for high frequency applications
 Application Program Command, a C1 control code
 Asynchronous procedure call, a function that executes asynchronously in the context of a specific thread on Microsoft Windows
 Atari Punk Console, a simple DIY noisemaker circuit
 VIA APC, a low-cost Android PC computer

Science

General
 Article processing charge, a fee charged to authors for publication in an open access journal

Biology and medicine
 Activated protein C, an anti-coagulant and anti-inflammatory protein
 Adenomatous polyposis coli, a tumor suppressor protein encoded by the APC gene, mutations in which can cause colon cancer
 Anaphase-promoting complex, a ubiquitin ligase cell cycle protein
 Antigen-presenting cell, a type of cell that displays foreign antigens
 APC Family, a family of transport proteins
 APC Superfamily, a superfamily of transport proteins
 APC tablet, analgesic compound of aspirin, phenacetin, and caffeine
 Argon plasma coagulation, an endoscopic technique for controlling hemorrhage
 Atrial premature complexes, a type of premature heart beat or irregular heart beat or arrhythmia which start in the upper two chambers of the heart

Chemistry
 Allophycocyanin, a protein from the light-harvesting phycobiliprotein family
 Allylpalladium chloride dimer, a chemical compound
 Ammonium perchlorate, a powerful oxidizer used in solid rocket motors

Military
 Armour-piercing capped, an anti-armor shell type
 Army Proficiency Certificate, the training syllabus of the Army Cadet Force
 B&T APC9 (Advanced Police Carbine), a submachine gun produced by B&T AG
 B&T APC45, a variant of the B&T APC9

Organizations
 Astroparticle and Cosmology Laboratory, a research laboratory located in Paris
 A.P.C., A French design group and clothing retailer
 African, Caribbean and Pacific Group of States, a group of countries
 African Paralympic Committee, a sports organization based in Cairo, Egypt
 Alianza Popular Conservadora, a political party in Nicaragua
 Alien Property Custodian, a former office within the Government of the United States
 All People's Congress, a political party in Sierra Leone
 All Progressives Congress, a political party in Nigeria
 Alternativa Popular Canaria, a separatist political party of the Canary Islands
 American Pie Council, an organization committed to preserving America's pie heritage
 American Plastics Council, a major trade association for the U.S. plastics industry
 Americas Paralympic Committee, an umbrella organization of National Paralympic Committees
 Anadarko Petroleum Corporation
 Animal Procedures Committee, a UK public body and task force
 Anti-Poverty Committee, a direct action organization in Vancouver, Canada
 Apocalypse Production Crew, an MP3 warez organization
 Arab Potash Company, a potash production company headquartered in Jordan
 Armed Proletarians for Communism, an Italian far-left terrorist group of the 1970s
 Arrangers' Publishing Company, a sheet music publishing company in the United States
 Asia Pacific College, a joint venture between IBM Philippines and the SM Foundation
 Asian Paralympic Committee, an umbrella organisation of National Paralympic Committees
 Associated Presbyterian Churches, a Scottish Christian denomination
 Association for Progressive Communications, a worldwide network of organisations helping others use the internet to promote social justice and sustainable development 
 Association of Professional Chaplains, internationally certified hospice chaplains
 Atlantic-Pacific Capital, a US-based independent investment bank
 Australian Paralympic Committee
 Patriotic Alliance for Change, a Paraguayan political alliance (Alianza Patriótica por el Cambio)

Places
 Apc, Hungary, a village in the Heves County of Hungary
 Napa County Airport (IATA airport code APC), near Napa, California

Other uses
 A Perfect Circle, an American rock supergroup
 Alkali Pozzolan Cement, an alternative cement developed at Curtin University, Australia
 Ambulatory Payment Classification
 Attoparsec, an unusual unit of measurement
 Australian Provincial Championship, a rugby union competition in Australia
 Automatic Performance Control, a system that was used on some Saab H engines
 Average propensity to consume, the proportion of income spent
 North Levantine Arabic, by ISO 639-3 code

See also
 APCR (disambiguation)
 APCS (disambiguation)